Usuba bōchō (薄刃包丁, lit. thin knife) is the traditional vegetable knife for the professional Japanese chef. Like other Japanese professional knives, usuba are chisel ground, and have a bevel on the front side, and have a hollow ground urasuki on the back side. Usuba characteristically have a flat edge, with little or no curve, and are tall, to allow knuckle clearance when chopping on a cutting board. Usuba literally means "thin blade" indicating its relative thinness compared to other knives, required for cutting through firm vegetables without cracking them.  Due to its height and straight edge, usuba are also used for specialized cuts such as katsuramuki, shaving a vegetable cylinder into a thin sheet.

The Usuba bōchō is used by professionals and differs from the related  Nakiri bōchō, which is preferred for home use. While the nakiri bōchō's cutting blade is sharpened from both sides, the usuba bōchō's blade is sharpened only from one side, a style known as kataba in Japanese. This kataba style edge gives better cuts and allows for the cutting of thinner slices than the ryōba used for nakiri bōchō, but requires more skill to use. The highest quality kataba blades have a slight depression on the flat side. The sharpened side is usually the right side for a right hand use of the knife, but knives sharpened on the left side are available for left hand use. The usuba bōchō is heavier than a nakiri bōchō, although still much lighter than a deba bōchō.

There are several variations of the usuba bōchō.  The Kanto variation has a square blunt tip, making it appear like a small meat cleaver. The Kansai, kamagata style variation has a spine that drops down to the edge at the tip, allowing the usuba to do fine delicate work. However, this tip is also delicate and can be broken easily. The usuba is particularly popular with Kyoto chefs, who use the Kamagata usuba for most of their work.  Since Kyoto is landlocked, they rely more heavily on vegetables than Tokyo, making the usuba the quintessential knife of professional chefs there. In Kyoto cuisine, the versatile tip allows for intricate cuts and preparations.

References 

Japanese kitchen knives